The 1942 United States Senate special election in Minnesota took place on November 3, 1942. The election was held to fill the vacancy in the seat formerly held by the late Ernest Lundeen for the final two months of Lundeen's unexpired term. Governor Harold Stassen had appointed Joseph H. Ball to fill the seat in 1940, but this appointment was temporary and subject to a special election held in the next general election year thereafter—1942. Ball opted to run for the full six-year term immediately following the end of Lundeen's term, instead of running for election to continue for the remainder of the term. In Ball's stead, the Republican Party of Minnesota nominated Arthur E. Nelson, who, in the special election, defeated both of his challengers—Al Hansen of the Farmer–Labor Party of Minnesota and John E. O'Rourke of the Minnesota Democratic Party.

Following his 1940 appointment and subsequent election, Ball ultimately served the longest tenure of any Senator only elected once.

Farmer–Labor primary

Candidates

Declared
 Al Hansen, 1939 Farmer–Labor candidate for Mayor of Minneapolis (unsuccessful)
 John T. Lyons

Results

Republican primary

Candidates

Declared
 Cliff Blanchard
 Harry Lee
 Arthur E. Nelson, Former Mayor of St. Paul (1922-1926)
 Wilber L. Paulson
 Robert J. Seiberlich
 John A. Thompson
 Mrs. Mat Wagner

Results

Special election

Results

See also 
 1942 United States Senate elections

References

Minnesota 1942
Minnesota 1942
1942 Special
Minnesota Special
United States Senate Special
United States Senate 1942